Tony Lopez (born 1950) is an English poet who first began to be published in the 1970s. His writing was at once recognised for its attention to language, and for his ability to compose a coherent book, rather than a number of poems accidentally printed together. He is best known for his book False Memory (The Figures, 1996), first published in the United States and much anthologised.

Life

Lopez grew up in Brixton, South London, and was educated at local state schools including Henry Thornton Grammar School. He worked as a freelance writer of fiction, publishing five crime and science fiction novels with New English Library between 1973 and 1976, before going to the University of Essex (1977–80), and then taking up a research studentship at Gonville and Caius College, University of Cambridge, where J. H. Prynne supervised his PhD on the Scottish poet W. S. Graham.
He taught briefly at the University of Leicester (1986–87) and the University of Edinburgh (1987–89), and then for twenty years at the University of Plymouth (1989–2009), where he was appointed the first Professor of Poetry in 2000 and Emeritus Professor in 2009. He has received awards from the Wingate Foundation, the Society of Authors, the UK Arts and Humanities Research Council and Arts Council, England.
His poetry is featured in The Art of the Sonnet (Harvard), Anthology of Twentieth-Century British and Irish Poetry (Oxford University Press), Vanishing Points: New Modernist Poems (Salt), The Reality Book of Sonnets (RSE), Other: British and Irish Poetry since 1970 (Wesleyan University Press) and Conductors of Chaos (Picador). His critical writings are collected in Meaning Performance: Essays on Poetry (Salt) and The Poetry of W. S. Graham (Edinburgh University Press).

Lopez is married with two grown-up children and lives in Exmouth in Devon.

Bibliography

 Snapshots, London: Oasis Books, 1976
 Change, London: New London Pride, 1978
 The English Disease, London: Skyline Press, 1978
 A Handbook of British Birds, Durham, UK: Pig Press, 1982
 Abstract & Delicious, Warehorne, UK: Secret Books, 1982
 The Poetry of W. S. Graham, Edinburgh, UK: Edinburgh University Press, 1989
 A Theory of Surplus Labour, Cambridge, UK: Curiously Strong, 1990
 Stress Management, Manuden, UK: Boldface Press, 1994
 Negative Equity, Cambridge, UK: Equipage, 1995
 False Memory, Great Barrington, MA: The Figures, 1996
 Data Shadow, London: Reality Street, 2000
 Devolution, Great Barrington, MA: The Figures, 2000
 False Memory (new edition), Cambridge, UK: Salt, 2003
 Equal Signs, Cambridge, UK: Equipage, 2004
 Meaning Performance: Essays on Poetry, Cambridge, UK: Salt, 2006
 Covers, Cambridge, UK: Salt, 2007
 Poetry & Public Language (co-edited with Anthony Caleshu), Exeter, UK: Shearsman, 2007
 Darwin, Dartington, UK: Acts of Language, 2009
 Only More So, New Orleans: LA: University of New Orleans Press, 2011; Bristol, UK: Shearsman, 2012
 The Text Festivals: Language Art and Material Poetry (ed.), Plymouth, UK: University of Plymouth Press, 2013

References

1950 births
Living people
People from Brixton
Alumni of the University of Essex
Alumni of Gonville and Caius College, Cambridge
English male poets